Eurelia is a town and locality in the Australian state of South Australia located on the east side of the Flinders Ranges about   north of the state capital of Adelaide and about  from the municipal seat of Orroroo.

The town was surveyed in July 1878 and was gazetted as a government town on 12 September 1878 with its name being derived from the cadastral unit of the Hundred of Eurelia. The locality's boundaries were created on 16 December 1999 for the “long established name” and includes the site of the Government Town of Eurelia.

Eurelia's name comes from the local Jadliaura language and translates to "place of the ear". It is thought that local Dreamtime stories associated with the Ranges locates Eurelia as an "ear" of a prostrate man.  The pronunciation of the town's name gives rise to some long standing jokes.  One joke has two railway porters at each end of the platform and as each train pulls in one would call out "You're a liar!  You're a liar", and the other would reply "You really are!  You really are!".  (I.e. the town's name sounds like either "you're a liar" or "you really are", depending on which syllable the stress falls). The "correct" pronunciation is "you really are"

The District Council of Carrieton, based in adjacent Carrieton, was known as the District Council of Eurelia for the first six years of its existence, from 1888 to 1894.

Land use within the locality is ’primary production’ and is concerned with “agricultural production and the grazing of stock on relatively large holdings.”

Eurelia is located within the federal division of Grey, the state electoral district of Stuart and the local government area of the District Council of Orroroo Carrieton.

Railways 

Eurelia is located on route of the former Peterborough–Quorn railway line, built in 1881, and ceased regular use by the 1980s. It then became the northern terminus of operations of the Steamtown Peterborough Railway Preservation Society running trains from Peterborough between 1981 and 2002.

Eurelia had two dams. The first built when the railway was constructed by C & E Miller. The original dam held .  This dam was later supplemented by a new dam of the same  capacity which was built to the north of the original dam, with the intent that the old dam would act as a settling pond. Construction started in 1948 and was completed in 1952. The dam remained empty until 1958 when, after heavy rains in the region, both dams filled.

Water from the dams was shipped across the SAR  during times of drought.

References 

Towns in South Australia